Tracie McBride may refer to:
 Tracie McBride (writer), speculative fiction writer
 Tracie Joy McBride (1975–1995), murder victim